Chief Rabbi David Tevele Schiff (died December 17, 1791; or, in the Hebrew calendar, 26 Kislev 5551) was the chief rabbi of Great Britain and the rabbi of the Great Synagogue of London from 1765 until his death.

Rabbi Schiff was a disciple of Rabbi Jacob Joshua Falk, author of the Classic Commentary on the Talmud "Pene Yehoshua".  He was a contemporary of Rabbi Yechezkel Landau, Prague's Chief Rabbi and author of the fundamental Responsae "Noda B'Yhuda".  His most famous disciple was the holy Rabbi Nosson Adler of Frankfurt-am-Main, famous for his Kabbalistic teachings.

Rabbi Schiff's resting place is at Britain's first Ashkenazic cemetery since the expulsion of Jewry in medieval times. It is situated at 27 Alderney Road, London E1 4EG, in London's East End.

References 

 
 
 
 
 
 Past Chief Rabbis
 The History of the Great Synagogue

18th-century English rabbis
Chief rabbis of the United Kingdom
18th-century German rabbis
German emigrants to England
Rabbis from Frankfurt
Year of birth missing
1791 deaths
British people of German-Jewish descent